Sachi-Sethu was a former screenwriter duo of Sachy and Sethu who worked in Malayalam cinema. The pair wrote a total of five films, beginning with Chocolate in 2007 and ending with Doubles in 2011, after which they worked as independent writers. Each made their solo debuts in 2012 with Run Baby Run (Sachi) and Mallu Singh (Sethu), respectively.

Filmography

Scripted by Sachi

Scripted by Sethu

References

Indian male screenwriters
Indian screenwriting duos
Malayalam screenwriters